Gerd Hennig (24 April 1935 – 26 December 2017) was a German football referee.

Between 1964 and 1982, he refereed a total of 161 games in the Bundesliga, Germany's top football league. He refereed the DFB-Pokal final between FC Bayern Munich and 1. FC Nürnberg in 1982. Hennig is also Chairman referee of the region Duisburg – Mülheim – Dinslaken and lives in Duisburg.

References

External links
 Profile at worldfootball.net

1935 births
2017 deaths
German football referees
Sportspeople from Duisburg
20th-century German people